Jerry Chan Man (born 4 October 1993) is a Macau footballer. He currently plays as a defender for Liga de Elite club Benfica de Macau and the Macau national football team.

Honours

Club
Benfica de Macau
Liga de Elite: 2015, 2016

Individual
2015-16 Macau Footballer of the Year

Personal life
In addition to playing football part time, Chan is a firefighter in Macau.

International goals

References

External links
 

Living people
1993 births
Macau footballers
Macau international footballers
C.D. Monte Carlo players
S.C. Olhanense players
S.L. Benfica de Macau players
Chinese firefighters
Association football defenders
Liga de Elite players